The Rieder automatic rifle was a fully automatic Lee–Enfield SMLE rifle conversion of South African origin. The Rieder device could be installed quickly with the use of simple tools. A similar weapon of New Zealand origin was the Charlton automatic rifle.

While the rifle had no select fire capability, single shots could be achieved by releasing the trigger quickly. Alternatively the bolt could be operated manually if the gas vein was closed. Prototype rifles fitted with the "Rieder attachment" or device were tested on bipod and tripod mounts and proved reliable with little maintenance, although recommendations were made to change the sight system to take account of vibration during automatic fire.

See also
Ekins automatic rifle
Howard Francis semi-automatic carbine
Howell automatic rifle
Huot automatic rifle

References

External links
Rieder Automatic Rifle
Special Service Lee Enfields: Commando and Auto Models

.303 British rifles
Light machine guns
Automatic rifles
Rifles of South Africa